Orthotylus halophilus is a species of bug from a family of Miridae that is endemic to the Canary Islands.

References

halophilus
Insects described in 1953
Endemic fauna of the Canary Islands